Cape Elliott is an ice-covered cape marking the northern extremity of the Knox Coast of Wilkes Land, Antarctica. It was delineated from aerial photographs taken by U.S. Navy Operation Highjump (1946–47) and named by the Advisory Committee on Antarctic Names after J.L. Elliott, chaplain on the sloop Vincennes of the United States Exploring Expedition (1838–42) under Charles Wilkes.

References 

Headlands of Wilkes Land